Tarapacá (Hispanicized spelling) or Tara Paka (Aymara for "two-headed eagle", Quechua for Andean eagle) may refer to:

San Lorenzo de Tarapacá, a town in northern Chile
Tarapacá Province, Chile, a former province, now divided into
Tarapacá Region
Arica-Parinacota Region
Tarapacá Department (Peru), a former department of Peru
Tarapacá Province (Peru), a former province of Peru, before the War of the Pacific
Tarapacá, Amazonas, municipality in the Amazonas Department, Colombia
Tara Paka or Qachini, a mountain in Peru